This is a list of seasons played by Kristiansund Ballklubb in Norwegian football from their first season in 2004 to the most recent completed season. It details the club's achievements in major competitions, and the top scorers. The statistics is up to date as of the end of the 2019 season.

2004–present

References

Seasons
 
Kristiansund BK